Hawkshead Grammar School in Hawkshead, Cumbria, England was founded in 1585 by Archbishop Edwin Sandys, of York, who petitioned a charter from Queen Elizabeth I to set up a governing body. The early School taught Latin, Greek and sciences, including arithmetic and geometry. Although the School closed in 1909, the building functions today as Hawkshead Grammar School Museum and is open to the public.

The building is Grade II* listed.

Notable former pupils

Scholars included:

 Poet William Wordsworth
 Christopher Wordsworth (Trinity)
 Reverend George Walker (a sixteenth-century divine and one of the Westminster Assembly)
 Joshua King
 Sir James Scarlett, 1st Baron Abinger
 Sir Frederick Pollock, 3rd Baronet
 Bishop Law
 Daniel Rawlinson
 Thomas Alcock Beck
 Henry Ainslie
 Montague Ainslie
 Edward Baines
 William Pearson (Astronomer)

See also

 List of English and Welsh endowed schools (19th century)
 Grade II* listed buildings in South Lakeland
 Listed buildings in Hawkshead

References

External links 

Hawkshead Grammar School Museum website

1585 establishments in England
Educational institutions established in the 1580s
Furness
Defunct schools in Cumbria
Museums in Cumbria
Defunct grammar schools in England
Grade II* listed buildings in Cumbria
Hawkshead